The 1985–86 DePaul Blue Demons men's basketball team represented DePaul University during the 1985–86 NCAA Division I men's basketball season. They were led by head coach Joey Meyer, in his 2nd season at the school, and played their home games at the Rosemont Horizon in Rosemont.

After finishing the regular season at 16–12, DePaul received a bid to the 1986 NCAA Tournament as the No. 12 seed in the East region. DePaul beat Virginia in the opening round and Oklahoma in the round of 32 to advance to the Sweet Sixteen. In the East Regional semifinals, the Blue Demons were defeated by No. 1 Duke, 74–67, and finished the season 18–13.

Roster

Schedule and results

|-
!colspan=9 style=| Regular season

|-
!colspan=12 style=| NCAA Tournament

Source:

Rankings

Team players drafted into the NBA

References 

DePaul Blue Demons men's basketball seasons
DePaul
1985 in sports in Illinois
1986 in sports in Illinois
DePaul